DYRO, broadcasting as Radyo One Cebu 90.1 is a radio station owned by Soundstream Broadcasting Corporation

History
The station was inaugurated in 1995 in Miagao as DYST, serving as a relay station of Manila-based Showbiz Tsismis. In 1999, it rebranded as Yes FM (with the call letters DYYS) and adopted a mass-based format. It transferred to Jaro Plaza. Initially having its own set of DJs, in 2002, it went to full automation. At the same time, it transferred its studios to Guanco St.

On May 14, 2009, the station rebranded to 92.3 WRocK and switched to a Soft AC format. On July 1, 2009, It rebranded again to 92.3 Easy Rock. Since September 2018, it has its own set of DJs, such as Jay Perillo (formerly from Easy Rock Manila) and Birdman Vargas.

References

Radio stations in Iloilo City
Adult contemporary radio stations in the Philippines
Radio stations established in 1992
Easy Rock Network stations